John Sayre (born April 1, 1936) is an American competition rower and Olympic champion.

Born in Tacoma, Washington, Sayre won a gold medal in coxless fours at the 1960 Summer Olympics.

References

1936 births
American male rowers
Rowers at the 1960 Summer Olympics
Olympic gold medalists for the United States in rowing
Living people
Medalists at the 1960 Summer Olympics
Pan American Games medalists in rowing
Pan American Games gold medalists for the United States
Rowers at the 1959 Pan American Games